was a Japanese musician and composer. He is considered a pioneer of ambient music in Japan.  His music lies mostly in the minimalist genre of kankyō ongaku, or environment music—soft electronic melodies infused with the sounds of nature: babbling brooks, steady rain, and morning birds. However, not all Yoshimura's work included nature sounds. His album Green (1986) only contained them in the United States release, as they were excluded in the Japanese version.

Early life
Hiroshi Yoshimura was born in Yokohama, Kanagawa in 1940. He started to learn piano at the age of 5. He graduated from Waseda School of Letters, Arts and Sciences II in 1964. He was inspired by the Fluxus movement and the work of Harry Partch and Erik Satie.

Career 
He started the computer music group "Anonyme" in 1972. The 70's saw Yoshimura heavily inspired by Brian Eno, who had a similar minimalist ambient style.
In 1978, he was commissioned by the NHK to compose the piece "Alma's Cloud".

In addition to solo performances and improvisational music, he performed production performance and sound objects, environmental music containing graphic design and sound design, visual poetry, and worked on sound design business in collaboration with TOA. He also made music for galleries, museums, building spaces and train stations. He was at the forefront of environmental music.He worked as a part-time lecturer in the Industrial Design Department at the Faculty of Engineering of the University of Chiba and at the Music Design Department of Kunitachi College of Music. He held workshops on citizen participation in museums.

Legacy
In 2017, Yoshimura, as well as other ambient Japanese musicians, received a resurgence due to the YouTube algorithm. In 2019, the song "Blink", from Yoshimura's debut album, was selected for compilation album Kankyo Ongaku: Japanese Ambient, Environmental & New Age Music 1980-1990. In 2020, Light in the Attic Records re-issued Green.  

His music has received much critical acclaim. In 2018, Crack Magazine selected his albums Green and Music For Nine Post Cards as the number 1 and number 7th most essential Japanese ambient albums, respectively. Malcolm Standing for Demo Magazine referred to Yoshimura as "one of the most influential and prolific of the artists to come out of Japan’s ambient renaissance". Tom Moon of NPR noted Yoshimura as "one of the revered pioneers of Japanese electronic music".

Discography

References 

1940 births
2003 deaths
20th-century Japanese musicians
Ambient musicians
Deaths from skin cancer
People from Yokohama
Waseda University alumni